The 1934 Troy State Red Wave football team represented Troy State Teachers College (now known as Troy University) as an independent during the 1934 college football season. Led by fourth-year head coach Albert Elmore, the Red Wave compiled an overall record of 7–2.

Schedule

References

Troy State
Troy Trojans football seasons
Troy State Red Wave football